The Legion of Extraordinary Dancers, commonly called The LXD, is a 2010–2011 American web series that premiered on Hulu. The series follows two groups of rival dancers: The Alliance of the Dark, who are the villains, and The Legion of Extraordinary Dancers, the heroes, who discover they have superpowers referred to as "the Ra" through their dance abilities. The entire story takes place over hundreds of years, beginning in the 1920s, up to the year 3000.

The series was created, directed, and produced by Jon M. Chu, who says he was inspired to create it by Michael Jackson's "Thriller" and "Smooth Criminal" music videos and by the dancers he met while filming the movie Step Up 2: The Streets. The series was choreographed by Christopher Scott and Harry Shum, Jr., with assistant choreography by Galen Hooks. Members had a wide variety of specialties, including hip-hop, krumping, contemporary, tricking, popping, b-boying, jazz, tap, and ballet. All of the choreography and stunts were real. There were no special effects or wire work, and the entire series was shot on location without the use of green screens.

50% of the sales of the official LXD T-shirt went to support the work of the nonprofit organization Invisible Children, Inc. Puma was the lead sponsor for The LXD. As of 2010, an official soundtrack was in production. The first LXD theatrical release was presented as a 3D short film, screening before the director's fan cut of Justin Bieber: Never Say Never.

Members and cast
Sources:

 Roger Aaron Brown as The Narrator
Jaime "Venum" Burgos, Ivan "Flipz" Velez,and Josh "Milky" Ayers  as The Observers
Wilbur "Wilpower" Urbina as Joe Drift
Luis "Luigi" Rosado as Trevor Drift
Carly Lang as Alice Wondershaw
 Daniel "Cloud" Campos as The Illister
Jeremy Marinas as Justin Starr
Travis Wong as Jimmy Angel a.k.a. Shado
 Nicholas Braun as Cole Waters
Chadd "Madd Chadd" Smith as Sp3cimen
John "J Rock" Nelson as Jasper James a.k.a. The Dark Doctor
Marie "Pandora" Medina as Autumn
Shelby Rabara as The Dark Nurse
Richard "Steelo" Vazquez as Spex
Vivian Bang as Miss Harlow
Oscar Orosco as Tendo
Aaron "Duece" Cooke as Dante
 Christopher "Lil' C" Toler as Z
 Galen Hooks as Ninjato
 William Wingfield as Katana
 Harry Shum Jr. as Elliot Hoo
Aja George as Stereo
Terence Dickson as Minijack
Straphanio "Shonnie" Solomon as Phono
Christa Lewis as Parvine
Sean "Fresh" Redding as Polo
Diva Zappa as Ruth
Nick Demoura as Murray
Robert Rich as Gus
Charlie "VZion" Schmidt as The Prophet (season one) and The Ringmaster (season three)
 Christopher Scott as Copeland
David "Kid David" Shreibman as Karen a.k.a. The Kidd
Stephen "tWitch" Boss as  Dr. E
Harmony Costa, Antwan Davis, and Khalid Freeman as Beat Bullies
 Caity Lotz as Taylor Jensen
Adedamola "Nugget" Orisagbemi, Nicholas "Slick" Stewart, and Marc "Marvelous" Inniss as The Eaters
Jesse "Casper" Brown as Peetie a.k.a. Fangz
Anis Cheurfa as Achilles
Carey Ysais as Karey
Ricardo "Boogie Frantick" Rodriguez as The Wave
Josue "Beastmode" Figueroa as Stakka
Danni "Danni G" Gutierrez as Dreads
Cuong "Tony Styles" Ly  as Waru
 Marie "Maryss from Paris" Courchinoux as Scales
 Rino Nakasone as Teethe
Maya Chino as Gills
Chanel Malvar as Finns
Brandon Philips as Umbra
Bryan Tanaka as Umbra
Dondraico 'Draico' Johnson as Umbra
Giovanni Watson as Umbra
JD McElroy as Umbra
Mykal Bean as Umbra
Brandon Shaw as Umbra
Cassidy Noblett as Umbra
Johnny Erasme as Umbra
Beau "Casper" Smart as Ox
Luke Broadlick as Ox
Ryan "McLovin" Houchin as Ox
 Tara Macken as Ox
 Cameron Boyce as [Young] Jasper James a.k.a. The Dark Doctor
 Ele Keats as Diane James
Johnathan "Johnny 5" Malstrom as Experiment 2A2
Peter "Smurf" Quintanilla as Experiment 4K8
Jefferey "Machine" McCann as Experiment 9S2
Lorenzo "Devious" Chapman as Experiment J4E
Patrick "Pakelika 10" Wesley as The Exterminator
Terrance Harrison as Gimpspark
Ron "Tempo" Evans Jr., and Soh "Tetris" Tanaka  as Rabids
Adrian "Lobo" Miramontes, Joshua "ACE" Ventura, Mike Song, and Anthony "Anflowny" Lee as Shadows
Nancy "Asia One" Yu as LXD Elder: The Countess
Rueben Lucky "Flat Top" Hall as LXD Elder: Groove Guardian
Andre "Boppin Dre" Diamond as LXD Elder: Black Diamond
Jerry "Flo Master" Randolph as LXD Elder
Roger "Orko" Romero as LXD Elder
Ceasare "Tight Eyez" Willis as LXD Elder: Style Ripper
Kendall Glover as Lil Rina
Angelo "Lil Demon" Baligad as Dark Nurse's son

Series history
The first two seasons of The LXD were released in 2010 and the third premiered in August 2011. Shooting first began for the series in February 2009. It took 18 months to complete filming for the first two seasons.

The Uprising Begins
Season one focuses on the back story of the Legion of Extraordinary Dancers, the "good guys". Each episode introduces each of the characters and their specific dance ability. The season premiered  July 7, 2010 on Hulu. The first two webisodes (Chapters in the series), "The Tale of Trevor Drift" and "AntiGravity Heroes", were both released July 7. The remaining eight were released every Wednesday afterward.

Secrets of the Ra
Season two tells the back story of the villains of The LXD which consist of Organization X—called The Ox—and The Umbras. The second season also premiered with two chapters, "The Legion" and "Lessons", which were released October 26, 2010. The remaining webisodes were released every Wednesday after with the exception of Wednesday, November 24 due to the Thanksgiving holiday.

Super Ballet
There is episode titled "Super Ballet" that was supposed to be presented as part of the series narrative. It was left out of season two because Chu felt it didn't fit into the storyline. He eventually released it in 2012 when The LXD became available on YouTube. The dancing performed in the episode is a mix of ballet and tricking.

Rise of the Drifts
Season three tells the back story of how the LXD was formed and what led to the Ox and the Umbras uniting to become the Alliance of the Dark. I.aM.mE, a dance crew from Houston, TX who won season six of America's Best Dance Crew, makes an appearance in season three as the Reanimators. Ceasare "Tight Eyez" Willis, the creator of the dance style krumping, also appears in season three as the character of Style Ripper, one of the LXD Elders. Season three premiered on August 11, 2011, with two chapters: "The Extraordinary 7" and "Ashes". With the exception of September 1, the rest of the chapters in the season were released weekly on Thursdays.

Reception
The LXD is the most viewed original web series on Hulu. AdvertisingAge.com gave the series a favorable review stating "...each episode of 'LXD' packs a wealth of narrative sophistication into its eight or nine minutes. Combine this with the theater-worthy production values and a cast that exerts itself to an ungodly extent, and the end result is—pun time!—extraordinary." Mashable.com called the series "...a game-changer in the way that web series—and the arts—are presented online. Oh yeah, and it’s stunning." In its review of season one, PentacleBlogs.org praised the dancing but felt the acting was weak: "At best this Hollywood narrative approach makes The LXD series seem a bit clunky and cheesy, and at worse it detracts from the enjoyment of truly great dancing."

After their performance at TED 2010, The LXD received the longest standing ovation in TED history. In November 2010, The LXD won a Media Vanguard Award for "Best Original Web Series." In January 2011, the series won a Digital Luminary Award in the "Original Web Content" category. In February 2011, it was announced that Jon Chu would win the Pioneer Award at the International Digital Emmy Awards for the series. At the announcement, IATAS President and CEO, Bruce Paisner remarked "Jon M. Chu is one of the most up & coming directing talents of our time and we look forward to honoring him for his innovative contributions to the field of digital entertainment with our Pioneer Prize."

Live performances
The LXD has performed live for YouTube Live '08 and for the TBS Ellen DeGeneres special Ellen's Even Bigger Really Big Show at Caesar's Palace. In May 2010, they were the opening act for the Glee Live! tour. They performed by invitation on season six of So You Think You Can Dance, the 2010 TED conference, and the 82nd Academy Awards. In October 2010, the LXD performed at YouTube Play in New York. In December 2010, they performed on the Conan show. In 2011, they joined the cast of Glee again on their second international tour.

Footnotes

References

External links

2010 web series debuts
2011 web series endings
Dance companies in the United States
Dance in arts
Hip hop dance